Trans-Fly may refer to:

Linguistics
Trans-Fly languages
Eastern Trans-Fly languages
Trans-Fly–Bulaka River languages

Geography
Trans-Fly savanna and grasslands

See also
Fly River
Western Province (Papua New Guinea)
Merauke Regency